Domingo Tibaduiza Reyes (born November 22, 1950) is a former long-distance runner from Gameza, Colombia, who represented his native country at four consecutive Summer Olympics: in the 10,000 metres (1972, 1976, 1980 and 1984), the 5,000 metres (1976) and in the men's marathon (1980, 1984).  He currently holds the Colombian national record 3000 metres, 10000 metres and 20000 metres.

He won elite road races in his career, with highlights including the 1982 Berlin Marathon with a time of 2:14:47, as well as the 1982 America's Finest City Half Marathon and the Giro al Sas in 1978.

His personal best at the marathon distance is 2:11:21 at the 1983 New York City Marathon. He finished in eighth place.

Domingo Tibaduiza and his elite distance running brother Miguel spent many years in Reno, Nevada in the United States.  Domingo coached at Galena High School, where his team included his family of three sons and a daughter.  Among them, the family name dominated distance race results in the area for decades, as the brothers advanced into Masters age divisions and the children excelled.

For the 2012 London Olympics, he trained athletes in Tunja, Colombia.

He is the uncle of Los Angeles based artist Ricky Amadour.

References

 
 
 http://rickyamadour.com

1950 births
Living people
Colombian male long-distance runners
Colombian male marathon runners
Athletes (track and field) at the 1971 Pan American Games
Athletes (track and field) at the 1972 Summer Olympics
Athletes (track and field) at the 1975 Pan American Games
Athletes (track and field) at the 1976 Summer Olympics
Athletes (track and field) at the 1980 Summer Olympics
Athletes (track and field) at the 1983 Pan American Games
Athletes (track and field) at the 1984 Summer Olympics
Athletes (track and field) at the 1987 Pan American Games
Olympic athletes of Colombia
Pan American Games gold medalists for Colombia
Pan American Games silver medalists for Colombia
Pan American Games bronze medalists for Colombia
Pan American Games medalists in athletics (track and field)
Berlin Marathon male winners
Colombian masters athletes
Central American and Caribbean Games gold medalists for Colombia
Competitors at the 1974 Central American and Caribbean Games
Central American and Caribbean Games medalists in athletics
Medalists at the 1975 Pan American Games
Medalists at the 1983 Pan American Games
Sportspeople from Boyacá Department